A list of films produced in Egypt in 1978. For an A-Z list of films currently on Wikipedia, see :Category:Egyptian films.

External links
 Egyptian films of 1978 at the Internet Movie Database
 Egyptian films of 1978 elCinema.com

Lists of Egyptian films by year
1978 in Egypt
Lists of 1978 films by country or language